The Church of the Province of the Indian Ocean is a province of the Anglican Communion. It covers the islands of Madagascar, Mauritius and the Seychelles. The current Archbishop and Primate is James Wong, Bishop of Seychelles.

Anglican realignment
The Church of the Province of the Indian Ocean is a member of the Global South and the Global Anglican Future Conference, and has been involved in the Anglican realignment. Archbishop James Wong attended GAFCON III, in Jerusalem, on 17–22 June 2018. The province was represented at the event by a ten-member delegation, six from Madagascar and four from the Seychelles.

Dioceses

Madagascan dioceses

Diocese of Antananarivo
The Bishop of Antananarivo has been the Ordinary of the Anglican Church in Antananarivo in the Indian Ocean since the diocese's erection in 1969. The current bishop is Samoela Jaona Ranarivelo.

Diocese of Antsiranana
Bishops of Antsiranana have included Gabriel Josoa (until 1982), Keith Benzies (1982 to his death in 2002), Roger Chung Po Chuen (until 2012), Oliver Simon (2012–2015) and Théophile Botomazava (2015-2021).

Diocese of Fianarantsoa
The diocese of Fianarantsoa, has been established since at least 2003 and Gilbert Rakotondravelo had been the Bishop of Fianarantsoa since before 2010.

Diocese of Mahajanga
Jean-Claude Andrianjafimanana had been the (Anglican) Bishop of Mahajanga, since before 2003.

Diocese of Toamasina
When Grosvenor Miles was appointed assistant bishop of Madagascar in 1938, he based himself in Tamatave, with the intention that this would become a diocesan see when the diocese of Madagascar was divided up; but, in fact, the diocese of Tamatave was not created until 1969. It was subsequently renamed the diocese of Toamasina. The inaugural bishop was James Seth from 1969 until his death in 1975. Jean-Paul Solo has been the (Anglican) Bishop of Toamasina, since before 2011.

Diocese of Toliara
Todd McGregor was elected in 2006 to become a suffragan/assistant bishop over the Toliara (Tuléar) missionary area of the Diocese of Antananarivo, to prepare that area to become a diocese. On 21 April 2013, the new Diocese of Toliara was erected out of Antananarivo diocese and McGregor became the first bishop diocesan.
On 14 March 2021, the Rt Rev Dr Samitiana Jhonson Razafindralambo, formerly the assistant bishop, was elected the next bishop and installed as the 2nd Bishop of Toliara on 25 April 2021.

Diocese of Mauritius
See: Bishop of Mauritius.

Diocese of Seychelles
The Bishop of Seychelles has been the Ordinary of the Anglican Church in the Seychelles in the Indian Ocean since the diocese's erection in 1973. The current bishop is James Wong, since 2009; he has also been the Archbishop of the Indian Ocean since 2017.

Archbishops
 1973–1976 Edwin Curtis
 1978–1983 Trevor Huddleston
 1984–1995 French Chang-Him
 1995–2005 Remi Rabenirina
 2006–2017 Ian Ernest
 2017–present James Wong

References

External links
Anglican Communion website information
An Order for the Celebration of the Holy Eucharist / Un ordre pour la célébration de la Sainte Eucharistie from the Diocese of Mauritius

Church of the Province of the Indian Ocean
Anglican Communion church bodies
Anglican realignment denominations
Indian Ocean
Christian denominations in Asia
Anglicanism in Asia
Indian Ocean